Vampire Idol is a 2011 South Korean youth sitcom that ran on MBN from 2011 to 2012.

Synopsis
A naïve vampire prince from Vampire planet visits Earth to see a live performance of his favorite idol contender. He remains stuck on Earth with his three trusted and loyal servants. He then decides to join the competition himself and struggles to become a global pop idol.

Cast

Main characters
 Lee Jung as Prince (Wang-ja)
 He gets everything perfect: appearance, character, talent, and attitude. But only when he is the prince of Vampire planet, on Earth he is considered the exact opposite and hated on for being "unattractive."
 Kang Min-kyung as Min-Kyung
 19 years old. She works as a road manager in the talent agency. Later she becomes the vocalist in a girl group.
 Shin Dong-yup as Dong-yup
 Manager of a talent agency. He's in charge of Vampire Voice. Everything he says is a lie and he's very good at it.
 Kim Soo-mi as Soo-mi
 61 years old. She works for the talent agency and is in charge of providing meals in the boarding house for the members of Vampire Voice.
 Lee Soo-hyuk as Soo-hyuk/Mukadil Paejua
 22 years old. He is one of Prince's servants. He is the vocalist of Vampire Voice and also plays the guitar and drums. He has a serious personality and is very vampire-like, always craving blood.
 Kim Woo-bin as Woo-bin/Gabri Rates
 22 years old. He is one of Prince's servants. He has super-sharp hearing.
 Hong Jong-hyun as Jong-hyun/Yariru Genius
 He is a genius with an IQ of 790. He is also very socially awkward.

Supporting characters
 Hwang Kwanghee as Kwang-hee
 Bang Min-ah as Minah
 Chun Woo-hee as Woo-hee
 Kim Soo-yeon as Soo-Yeon
 Lee Yu-bi as Yu-bi
 Oh Kwang-rok as Kwang-rok
 Kim Dong-soo as Dong-soo
 Kim Sook as Oh Sook/Jenny
 Don Spike as Teacher Don
 Song Soo-hyun as young Soo-mi
 Oh Hee-joon as Kwang-hee's manager
 Lee Hae-in as Hae-in
 Kim Sung-hoon

Cameo appearances
 Kim Wan-sun as Do Woo-mi
 Jay Park as J
 Lee Eui-jung
 Jung Heechul as himself (ep.07)
 Moon Joon-young as himself (ep. 07)

International broadcast
In Thailand aired on MCOT Family beginning July 18, 2015.

See also
 Vampire film
 List of vampire television series

References

External links
 Vampire Idol at Maeil Broadcasting Network 
 
 

Korean-language television shows
South Korean television sitcoms
Vampires in television
South Korean fantasy television series
2011 South Korean television series debuts
2012 South Korean television series endings
Maeil Broadcasting Network television dramas
Television series by IHQ (company)